Petitioning the Empty Sky is the second studio album by American metalcore band Converge. However, contrary to many sources, the band considers this a compilation album, being a collection of songs recorded at different times. While tracklists differ between releases, this album features studio recorded tracks along with live recordings of three songs. Petitioning the Empty Sky was released and distributed through several different labels beginning in the mid 90s.

Release
Petitioning the Empty Sky was originally released through Ferret Music in 1996 and was also one of the earliest albums released through the newly formed label. This early version was a 7-inch EP featuring only the first four tracks of the eventual full-length. Later that same year the record was re-released with four new tracks added to it. Two years later, the album was reissued through Converge's new label Equal Vision Records as EVR040 on January 20, 1998. The full length reissue contained three live tracks ("For You," "Homesong," and "Antithesis") recorded during a radio broadcast, three newly recorded tracks ("Buried But Breathing," "Farewell Note to This City," and "Color Me Blood Red") and one track ("Shingles") that was recorded along with the original four tracks, but were unreleased.

Shortly after the release of Converge's 2004 album You Fail Me through Epitaph Records, Equal Vision reissued remasters of Petitioning the Empty Sky and When Forever Comes Crashing. The updated version of Petitioning the Empty Sky featured new artwork from Isis frontman Aaron Turner, production work from Converge's Kurt Ballou in addition to Mike Poorman and Alan Douches, and an alternate version of "Love As Arson" as a bonus track. The liner notes also contain the first half of an essay written by the "Aggressive Tendencies" columnist and editor of the Canadian online magazine Exclaim!, Chris Gramlich. The second part of the essay is continued in When Forever Comes Crashing. The remaster was Equal Vision's EVR109 released on March 22, 2005.

In 2006, Jacob Bannon's Deathwish Inc. released a vinyl box set collection for the remasters of Petitioning the Empty Sky and When Forever Comes Crashing in a package dubbed Petitioning Forever. Due to the physical limitations of a vinyl LP, a single 12-inch record cannot hold all of the songs from the remaster. The three live tracks were released separately with the first pressing on a 7-inch vinyl with its own artwork based on box set packaging. The box set was Deathwish's DWI47, and the separate vinyl was cataloged as DWLIMITED04.

Song history 
Studio recordings of the live tracks "For You" and "Homesong" were originally released on the Unloved and Weeded Out 7-inch EP in 1995. The full length compilation version of Unloved and Weeded Out was later released in 2002 through Deathwish and also featured these two songs. The studio recording of "Antithesis" could originally be found on Converge's debut album Halo in a Haystack in 1994, and later on the compilation album Caring and Killing released in 1997. The song "Dead" was rerecorded from the version on Caring and Killing, which was recorded in 1994/1995. The original version of "Love As Arson" was released on When Forever Comes Crashing in 1998.

Tracks nine through eleven - "For You", "Antithesis" and "Homesong" - were recorded live during a performance on radio station WJUL, run by college students at UMass Lowell. A notable moment on the live track "Homesong" is when a band member breaks a guitar string and pauses the song, and bleeding singer Jacob Bannon claims to have "hit my head on a mic stand" and that it will "make us look punk." The original CD release on Ferret Music features "Homesong" as a hidden/untitled song following "Antithesis".

Reception

Allmusic critic Blake Butler wrote: "Converge can break multiple bones throughout the body with sound alone, assaulting with beautiful metal riffs, throat-ripping screams, and aggressive smashing percussion."

Track listings

Personnel

Converge
 Jacob Bannon – vocals
 Kurt Ballou – guitar, backing vocals, bass guitar (track 1)
 Aaron Dalbec – guitar (tracks 2, 3, 5, 7, 9–11)
 Jeff Feinburg – bass guitar
 Stephen Brodsky – bass guitar (track 12)
 Damon Bellorado – drums

Original production
 Brian McTernan – producer, engineer, mixing
 Mike West – engineer

Original artwork and design
 Jacob Bannon – artwork, design
 Mark Lickosky – photography, video stills
 Patrick Santini – photography
 Aaron Turner – artwork, paintings
 Erik Zimmerman – photography

Recording history
 Tracks 1–5 recorded by Brian McTernan at Salad Days studio in October 1995
 Tracks 6–8 recorded by Mike West at West Sound in February 1996
 Tracks 9–11 recorded live on the air at WJUL in August 1995
 Track 12 recorded by Jim Siegel at The Outpost in May 1997

Remaster production (tracks 1–8, 12)
 Kurt Ballou – mixing at GodCity Studios in July 2004
 Mike Poorman – assistant mix engineering
 Alan Douches – mastering at West West Side Music

Remaster artwork and design
 Jacob Bannon – design
 Chris Boart – photography
 Danielle Dombrowski – photography
 High Roller Studios – enhanced video
 Nataija Kent – photography
 Mark Lickosky – video still
 Aaron Turner – artwork

References

External links
Petitioning the Empty Sky stream at MySpace
Petitioning the Empty Sky catalog at Discogs
Petitioning the Empty Sky catalog at Rate Your Music

Converge (band) albums
1996 albums
2005 albums
Equal Vision Records albums
Ferret Music albums
Albums with cover art by Aaron Turner
Albums with cover art by Jacob Bannon
Albums produced by Brian McTernan